Hyalaethea dohertyi is a moth of the subfamily Arctiinae. It was described by Rothschild in 1910. It is found in Papua New Guinea.

References

Arctiinae
Moths described in 1910